6β-Hydroxy-7α-thiomethylspironolactone (6β-OH-7α-TMS) is a steroidal antimineralocorticoid of the spirolactone group and a major active metabolite of spironolactone. Other important metabolites of spironolactone include 7α-thiospironolactone (7α-TS; SC-24813), 7α-thiomethylspironolactone (7α-TMS; SC-26519), and canrenone (SC-9376).

Spironolactone is a prodrug with a short terminal half-life of 1.4 hours. The active metabolites of spironolactone have extended terminal half-lives of 13.8 hours for 7α-TMS, 15.0 hours for 6β-OH-7α-TMS, and 16.5 hours for canrenone, and accordingly, these metabolites are responsible for the therapeutic effects of the drug.

6β-Hydroxytestosterone, which is analogous to 6β-OH-7α-TMS, has been found to possess virtually no androgenicity.

See also
 7α-Thioprogesterone

References

Further reading
 

Secondary alcohols
Antimineralocorticoids
Human drug metabolites
Lactones
Organosulfur compounds
Pregnanes
Spiro compounds
Spirolactones
Spironolactone